These are the official results of the Women's Shot Put event at the 1993 IAAF World Championships in Stuttgart, Germany. There were a total of 27 participating athletes, with the final held on Sunday August 15, 1993. The qualification mark was set at 19.00 metres.

Medalists

Schedule
All times are Central European Time (UTC+1)

Abbreviations
All results shown are in metres

Records

Qualification
 Held on Saturday 1993-08-14

Final

See also
 1990 Women's European Championships Shot Put (Split)
 1992 Women's Olympic Shot Put (Barcelona)
 1993 Shot Put Year Ranking
 1994 Women's European Championships Shot Put (Helsinki)

References
 Results
 IAAF
 Results - todor66.com

s
Shot put at the World Athletics Championships
1993 in women's athletics